Marwa Zein is a Sudanese  film director, scriptwriter and film producer. She is the author of the 2019 documentary, Khartoum Offside, and an advocate of women's rights through her work. She is the founder of ORE Production, a Khartoum-based film production company and one of the seven young filmmakers selected from around the world to attend the Cannes Film Festival 2019 by the International Emerging Film Talent Association (IEFTA).

Career
For her graduation project, Zein wrote, directed and produced the short documentary film, A Game, in 2009, translated into five languages and presented as an official selection in over 30 international festivals globally. At the 2016 Dubai International Film Festival (DIFF), her short film, One Week, Two Days!, starring Yasmin Raies and Amro Saleh, was premiered. It too was featured in various other film festivals.

In 2019, she completed a four-year long project, which she wrote and directed, a sports documentary called Khartoum Offside. It was globally premiered in the 2019 Berlinale Forum in Germany and was listed as one of three notable Sudanese films premiered in 2019 by Media Support. One central message of the film was stated in the introductory lines like this:   

In producing this film, she defied the Sudanese government's negative attitude towards women's involvement in filmmaking. Although she didn't encounter direct physical assault during the course of making this film, she received some threats of her camera or material possibly being destroyed. Finally, however, she received the necessary clearance for shooting this film. After the political changes brought about by the Sudanese revolution of 2018/19, the film was presented at the opening of the Sudan Independent Film Festival in Khartoum in January 2020.

Filmography

Accolades

See also 

 Cinema of Sudan

References

External links
 Marwa Zein on IMDb
 Marwa Zein's Biography on I am a Film

Sudanese film producers
Sudanese screenwriters
Sudanese women film directors
Living people
Year of birth missing (living people)
21st-century Sudanese artists
Sudanese documentary film directors